Chinwoke Mbadinuju (born 14 June 1945) was Governor of Anambra State in Nigeria from 29 May 1999 to 29 May 2003, elected on the People's Democratic Party (PDP) platform.

Early life and education 
Chinwoke Mbadinuju was born on 14 June 1945. He obtained a BA in political science, and a doctorate in government. He gained a law degree from one of the best English universities. He was an editor of Times International.

Before entering politics he was an associate professor of politics and African studies at the State University of New York. He was personal assistant to governor of the old Enugu State, Dr. Jim Chris Nwobodo, between 1979 and 1980.  He served as the personal assistant to President Shehu Shagari between 1980 and 1983.

He is married to Nnebuogo Mbadinuju, and they have five children: Ada Mbadinuju (a medical doctor), Chetachi Mbadinuju (an entrepreneur), Nwachukwu Mbadinuju (an operations manager), Uche Mbadinuju (a student) and Chima Mbadinuju (a student).

Governor of Anambra State

After the return to democracy in 1998, Chinwoke Mbadinuju became the People's Democratic Party (PDP) candidate for Anambra State governorship in competition with professor A.B.C Nwosu, who had served four military governors as commissioner for health, after a dispute that had to be resolved by the PDP Electoral Appeal Panel.

Mbadinuju had been sponsored by Emeka Offor, an Anambra kingmaker. After a falling out between Mbadinuju and his "godfather", Offor, the power struggle between the two men crippled the machinery of government in the state.
By September 2002, unpaid teachers had been on strike for a year and civil servants and court workers had been on strike for months.  The president of the Onitsha branch of the Nigerian Bar Association (NBA), Barnabas Igwe, said state leaders had pocketed the money meant to pay the striking workers. On 1 September 2002, Igwe and his pregnant wife Amaka were brutally and publicly assassinated by Nigerian militia men.

While in office, Chinwoke Mbaninuju passed a law that created the Anambra Vigilante Services, which legally enshrined the Bakassi Boys, a popular if feared vigilante group credited with reducing crime in the state.
Mbadinuju said that crime in the state had reached such an appalling level that something had to be done.
In a November 2009 interview, Mbadinuju defended his decision on the basis of the results it achieved in reducing crime.

He later fell out with Chris Uba, another power broker or godfather in the state. Mbadinuju claimed that he was excluded from the governorship contest in 2003 despite winning the PDP primaries because Uba and President Olusegun Obasanjo opposed his candidacy.
In his place, Dr. Chris Ngige ran for the PDP, but he was beaten by the candidate of the All Progressives Grand Alliance (APGA). Eventually, after the election was nullified and re-run, Chris Ngige gained the post.

Later career

Igwe had been a vocal critic of Mbadinuju, calling for his resignation due to the failure to pay government workers for several months.

References

1945 births
Living people
Nigerian Pentecostals
Igbo politicians
Governors of Anambra State
Peoples Democratic Party state governors of Nigeria